Plagiopyla is a genus of ciliates. It includes nine species:

https://academic.oup.com/zoolinnean/article-abstract/186/1/1/5095288==References==

Further reading

Ciliate genera
Plagiopylea